Thomas William Mark Ashby  (23 August 1895 – 26 September 1957) was a New Zealand local body administrator and Mayor of Auckland City from 1956 to 1957.

Biography
Born 23 August 1895 in Auckland, Ashby was educated at Te Aroha High School, and at both Victoria and Auckland Universities. He was a solicitor, and served in the Army in the First World War.

He was Auckland's Town Clerk (providing administration and advice to Auckland City Council) between 1944 and 1955 and was also secretary of the committee for the 1950 British Empire Games held at Auckland. In the 1951 King's Birthday Honours, Ashby was appointed an Officer of the Order of the British Empire for municipal services. In 1953, he was awarded the Queen Elizabeth II Coronation Medal.

Having retired as Town Clerk in 1955, he was elected to the city council, and in November 1956 successfully challenged the sitting mayor John Luxford, for the role. Luxford had claimed wasteful expenditure inside the council in his 1953 campaign, but (though initiating a number of reforms) had not been successful in chairing the council. Ashby died suddenly on 23 September 1957, near the end of his first year in office, aged 62 years, and was replaced by Keith Buttle in a by-election in November 1957.

References 

Who’s Who in New Zealand, 6th edition 1956, edited by Frank A Simpson (1956, Reed, Wellington)

1890s births
1957 deaths
Mayors of Auckland
20th-century New Zealand lawyers
New Zealand military personnel of World War I
University of Auckland alumni
Victoria University of Wellington alumni
New Zealand Officers of the Order of the British Empire
Independent politicians in New Zealand